Chasing Down a Spark is the third solo release by recording artist Bill Deasy although it is the second after formally leaving The Gathering Field.  Chasing Down a Spark follows his 2003 release Good Day No Rain and his first solo effort, Spring Lies Waiting, was recorded as a side project while still with The Gathering Field.

Chasing Down a Spark was produced by Kevin Salem and mixed by Joe Blaney.  The CD features guest appearances by Rachael Yamagata, Maia Sharp, Donnie Iris and The Clarks' Scott Blasey and Rob James.

Track listing
 Until I Get It Right 
 Something So Hard 
 Levi 
 Sweet Forgiveness 
 Naked 
 Wishing Well 
 Pass Me On 
 Fireflies 
 Now That I Know What it Means 
 Pale 
 And I Wait 
 Turn Your Light On

References

2005 albums